Gongora truncata is a species of orchid found in Mexico, Belize and Guatemala.

References

truncata
Orchids of Belize
Orchids of Guatemala
Orchids of Mexico
Orchids of Central America